George Granville Bradley  (11 December 1821 – 13 March 1903) was an English divine, scholar, and schoolteacher, who was Dean of Westminster (1881–1902).

Life
George Bradley's father, Charles Bradley, was vicar of Glasbury, Brecon, mid Wales.

Bradley was educated at Rugby under Thomas Arnold. He won an open scholarship at University College, Oxford, where in 1844 Bradley gained a first-class degree in literae humaniores. He was immediately elected to a Fellowship at University and, in the following year, won the Chancellor's prize for the Latin essay. He was an assistant master at Rugby from 1846 to 1858, when he succeeded G.E.L. Cotton as Headmaster of Marlborough College in Wiltshire. In the same year he look Holy Orders.

In 1870, Bradley was elected Master of his old college at Oxford. Under his mastership, he and the fellows of the college celebrated its apocryphal thousandth anniversary since its supposed founding by Alfred the Great. In 1874 he was appointed examining chaplain to the Archbishop of Canterbury, Dr Archibald Campbell Tait, under whom he had served at Rugby. In 1874 and 1875 he was Select Preacher at Oxford; he was also Honorary Chaplain to the Queen, becoming Chaplain in Ordinary in 1876. In 1878 he was chosen as the first chairman of the Association for the Education of Women, which aimed to promote the education of women at the university.

In 1881 Bradley was given a canonry in Worcester Cathedral; in August that year he was appointed Dean of Westminster in succession to Arthur Penrhyn Stanley, whose pupil and intimate friend he had been, and whose biographer he became. Shortly afterwards he was conferred the degree of DD by University College, Oxford. By the turn of the 20th century, he was in declining health, and had to be absent from his duties for considerable periods. He took part in the Coronation of King Edward VII and Queen Alexandra on 9 August 1902, and asked the King to be allowed to resign from his duties later the same month. For his service, he was invested as a Commander of the Royal Victorian Order (CVO) two days after the ceremony, on 11 August 1902.

Bradley was an Acting Chaplain of the 13th Middlesex (Queen's Westminsters) Volunteer Rifle Corps for 20 years, and received the Volunteer Officers' Decoration (VD) on 21 February 1902, before he resigned this appointment in November 1902.

The very reverend George Granville Bradley, of 42 Queen Anne's Gate, Westminster died on 13 March 1903. He was buried at Westminster Abbey on 17 March. The pall-bearers included the Master of Trinity College, Cambridge, Henry Montagu Butler; the Master of University College, Oxford, James Franck Bright; and the Headmasters of Marlborough and Rugby.

F. D. How included Bradley in the 1904 book Six Great Schoolmasters.

Works
Besides his Recollections of A. P. Stanley (1883) and Life of Dean Stanley (1892), Bradley published a revised version of Thomas Kerchever Arnold's Latin Prose Composition (commonly referred to by generations of Latin students as "Bradley's Arnold"); his more advanced intended work on Aids to Writing Latin Prose: with Exercises was edited and completed by T. L. Papillon. Further works were Lectures on Job (1884) and Ecclesiastes (1885).

Family
Bradley married Marian Jane Philpot at Great Cressingham on 18 December 1849. They had two sons and five daughters; of these children one son, Arthur Granville Bradley (1850–1943), and four daughters were writers, including Margaret Louisa Woods, Emily Tennyson Bradley (married Alexander Murray Smith), Mabel Charlotte, the Lady Birchenough (the wife of Sir Henry Birchenough, public servant and business man) and Rose Marian Bradley.

References

Sources

External links

 A Practical Introduction to Latin Prose Composition. Edited and revised by George Granville Bradley, 1899
 The Key to "Bradley's Arnold" (1940 edition, ed. Mountford) (Exercises 1 - 67 only)
 Daniel J. Nodes, Review of: J. F. Mountford (ed.), Bradley's Arnold Latin Prose Composition. Foreword and Updates by Donald E. Sprague.   Wauconda, IL:  Bolchazy-Carducci, 2006, Bryn Mawr Classical Review, 26 June 2006.

1821 births
1903 deaths
People educated at Rugby School
Alumni of University College, Oxford
Schoolteachers from Wiltshire
Deans of Westminster
Doctors of Divinity
English chaplains
Fellows of University College, Oxford
Masters of University College, Oxford
Masters of Marlborough College
English classical scholars